Solid Ground is the fourth album by New Zealand reggae band The Black Seeds released in 2008. It was released in North America in September 2009.

Track listing 
 "Come to Me"
 "Slingshot"
 "Take Your Chances"
 "Love Is a Radiation"
 "Send a Message"
 "Make a Move"
 "One Step at a Time"
 "Bulletproof"
 "Afrophone"
 "Strugglers"
 "Rotten Apple"
 "The Bubble"
 "Make a Move Dub"

2008 albums
The Black Seeds albums
Easy Star Records albums